Swan Lake is a local urban district within the Municipality of Lorne in the Canadian province of Manitoba. It is recognized as a designated place by Statistics Canada.

Demographics 

See also 
List of communities in Manitoba
List of designated places in Manitoba
List of local urban districts in Manitoba

References 

Designated places in Manitoba
Local urban districts in Manitoba